William Berwick may refer to:

 William Edward Hodgson Berwick (1888–1944), British mathematician
 William Berwick (footballer) (1884–1948), English footballer